The Alfa Romeo 2000 Sportiva is a 2-litre sports car made by Italian car manufacturer Alfa Romeo in 1954. Although developed to be built in a small series, just four were made — two coupés and two spiders.

History

The 2000 Sportiva was intended to be produced in limited volumes for Alfa Romeo's more sporting clientele, and to be used as a high-speed grand tourer or for racing in the sport class. The car never made it into series production: only four were built, two open-top spiders (also known as Alfa Romeo 1900 Sport Spider) and two 2-seat coupés.
Both bodies were designed by Franco Scaglione at Bertone.
Today a metallic silver coupé and a red spider are part of the Alfa Romeo Museum collection.

Some traits of the coupé—such as the wrap-around rear window and rear end treatment—were later seen on the mass-produced Alfa Romeo Giulietta Sprint, also by Bertone.

Specifications
Like the earlier Disco Volante, the 2000 Sportiva uses a tubular space frame chassis covered by an all-aluminium body, and a front mid-engine, rear-wheel-drive layout. Front suspension was by double wishbones, while at the rear there was a De Dion axle. Brakes were diagonally finned drums, the rears mounted inboard.

The engine was a dual overhead camshaft 1997.4 cc (bore 85 mm, stroke 88 mm) inline-four, with a cast iron block, aluminium cylinder head, and hemispherical combustion chambers.
The transmission was a 5-speed gearbox.

References

Bibliography

 

2000 Sportiva
Bertone vehicles
Cars introduced in 1954